Perameles allinghamensis, the Bluff Downs bandicoot, is a small extinct bandicoot that lived in Australia 4 million years ago in the Pliocene period. It was discovered at the Bluff Downs fossil site in northern Queensland.  Its diet probably consisted of insects and soft roots dug for with its front claws.

References

Peramelemorphs
Marsupials of Australia
Mammals of Queensland
Pliocene marsupials
Pliocene mammals of Australia
Pliocene first appearances
Pliocene extinctions
Fossil taxa described in 1976